Bogy is a commune of the Ardèche department in southern France.

Bogy may also refer to:
 Lewis V. Bogy (1813 – 1877), a United States Senator from Missouri
 Bogy-Chenault, Kentucky, an unincorporated community within Montgomery County, Kentucky, United States
 Bogy (footballer) (born 1989), an Egyptian footballer
 MC Bogy (born 1979), a German rapper

See also 
 Bogie (disambiguation)
 Bogey (disambiguation)
 Bougy (disambiguation)
 Buggy (disambiguation)